This is a list of Major League Baseball (MLB) pitchers with 200 or more career wins. In the sport of baseball, a win is a statistic credited to the pitcher for the winning team who was in the game when his team last took the lead. A starting pitcher must complete five innings to earn a win; if this does not happen, the official scorer awards the win based on guidelines set forth in the official rules.Cy Young holds the MLB win record with 511; Walter Johnson is second with 417. Young and Johnson are the only players to earn 400 or more wins. Among pitchers whose entire careers were in the post-1920 live-ball era, Warren Spahn has the most wins with 363. Only 24 pitchers have accumulated 300 or more wins in their careers. Roger Clemens is the only pitcher with 300 wins or more not elected to the National Baseball Hall of Fame. MLB officially only keeps statistics from the National League and the American League. This table includes statistics from other major leagues as well which are defunct now, including the American Association (AA), the National Association of Base Ball Players, and the National Association of Professional Baseball Players.

Key

List

Stats updated as of the end of the 2022 season.

See also

Baseball statistics
List of Major League Baseball annual wins leaders
List of Major League Baseball career games started leaders
List of Major League Baseball career games finished leaders
300 win club

Notes

References

External links

Major League Baseball records
Major League Baseball lists